pmdtechnologies ag  (stylised as pmdtechnologies) is a developer of CMOS semiconductor 3D time-of-flight (ToF) components and a provider of engineering support in the field of digital 3D imaging. The company is named after the Photonic Mixer Device (PMD) technology used in its products to detect 3D data in real time. The corporate headquarters of the company is located in Siegen, Germany.

History
pmdtechnologies was founded in 2002 by Rudolf Schwarte and the Audi Electronics Venture GmbH as a spin-off of the Center for Sensor Systems (ZESS) at the University of Siegen, Germany. It was the result of over 10 years of scientific research on 3D ToF imaging. Another ZESS spin-off, S-Tec Sensor GmbH, founded in 1996, began developing PMD products in 1997. This company was acquired by pmdtechnologies in 2002.

Basic patents for TOF-chips with new Photomischelemente (i.e. Photonic Mixer Elements resp. Devices) were filed in 1996 onwards by Prof. Rudolf Schwarte. A 3D Depth Camera with Time of Flight PMD sensors was available in the year 2000.

In 2002, together with three other nominees, the developing team of pmdtechnologies, represented by Rudolf Schwarte, Bernd Buxbaum, and Torsten Gollewski was nominated for the  German Future Prize, which is issued by the President of Germany, at that time Johannes Rau.

At the Hanover Fair in 2005 pmdtechnologies was awarded with the innovation prize called Hermes Award for its 
Efector PMD.

In 2009, pmdtechnologies received the 2009 European Real-Time 3D Imaging Enabling Technology Innovation Award by Frost & Sullivan.

PMD Technologies is taking part in Google's Project Tango.

Products
After initially focusing on industrial applications, pmdtechnologies began to spread their application areas into other fields, including the automotive sector, consumer electronics, gaming, security & surveillance, medical technology and live sciences.

In 2013 pmdtechnologies cooperated with Infineon Technologies to produce 3-D image sensor chips for touchless gesture recognition.

PMD sensors are used in the exteroceptive sensor suite of NASA's robot Valkyrie.

The autonomous humanoid robot Justin by the German Aerospace Center (DLR) is equipped with PMD-sensors.

References

Further reading
 Prof. Dr.-Ing. L. Overmeyer, S. Kleinert, "Stapeln leicht gemacht – 3D Kameratechnik unterstützt die Ladungshandhabung und hilft Unfälle zu vermeiden", "Industrial Vision", Vereinigte Fachverlage GmbH, Mainz, 2011

External links 
 

Companies established in 1996
Fabless semiconductor companies
Semiconductor companies of Germany